Gerald Eve LLP is a real estate advisory business headquartered in London, United Kingdom. The firm has offices in the West End of London, The City of London, Glasgow, Birmingham, Leeds, Manchester, Milton Keynes, Cardiff and West Malling.

History
The firm was founded as Gerald Eve & Co. on Chancery Lane, London in 1930 by Charles Gerald Eve (1872–1946), at the age of 57, later a President of the Royal Institution of Chartered Surveyors.

Practice
Gerald Eve converted into a limited liability partnership on 1 October 2008.

The firm's principal areas of practice include advice and commentary on United Kingdom real estate valuation and property services, town planning and property development and property taxes.
Ranked in the top 20 UK chartered surveying and property consultancy firms, Gerald Eve LLP has appeared in The Sunday Times' 100 Best Companies to Work For survey for six years running, placed 51st in the 2012 survey.

References

Real estate companies established in 1930
Property companies based in London
Property services companies of the United Kingdom
1930 establishments in England